Hægebostad is a municipality in Agder county, Norway. It is located in the traditional district of Lister. The administrative centre of the municipality is the village of Tingvatn. Other villages in Hægebostad include Eiken, Haddeland, and Snartemo. The municipality encompasses the northern end of the Lyngdalen valley which follows the river Lygna.

The Sørlandet Line railroad runs through the municipality from east to west, stopping at Snartemo Station in Snartemo. To get into and out of the valley in which Hægebostad is located, the trains must go through two of the longest railway tunnels in Norway: Hægebostad Tunnel and Kvineshei Tunnel.

The  municipality is the 215th largest by area out of the 356 municipalities in Norway. Hægebostad is the 295th most populous municipality in Norway with a population of 1,704.

Nine units of Sheltered housing are under construction (in 2022) after the previous ones were demolished.

History

The parish of Hægebostad was established as a municipality on 1 January 1838 (see formannskapsdistrikt law). On 1 January 1915, the municipality was divided into two municipalities: Eiken (population: 932) in the north and  Hægebostad (population: 867) in the south. On 1 January 1963, the two municipalities were merged back together as the municipality of Hægebostad once again. Prior to the merger, Hægebostad had 813 residents and Eiken had 784 residents.

Coat of arms
The coat of arms was granted on 4 April 1986. The official blazon is "Gules, two swords Or, points to the base". This means the arms have a red field (background) and the charge is two swords that are pointing downwards. The swords have a tincture of Or which means it is commonly colored yellow, but if it is made out of metal, then gold is used. The swords represent the two swards of Snartemo and Eiken dating from the 4th–6th century that were found in the municipality. The swords were highly decorated with silver and gold, but the ones on the arms are a more stylized heraldic design. The arms were designed by John Digernes.

Name
The municipality (originally the parish) is named after the old Hægebostad farm since the first Hægebostad Church was built there. This farm is now on the north side of the village of Snartemo. Before 1889, the name was written Hegebostad.

Geography
Hægebostad is an inland municipality, with Åseral municipality to the northeast, Kvinesdal to the west and Lyngdal to the south and east. The municipality covers the upper Lyngdalen valley from the mountains in the north, along the river Lygna to Lyngdal municipality in the south. The lake Lygne lies in the central part of the municipality.

Climate

Government
All municipalities in Norway, including Hægebostad, are responsible for primary education (through 10th grade), outpatient health services, senior citizen services, unemployment and other social services, zoning, economic development, and municipal roads. The municipality is governed by a municipal council of elected representatives, which in turn elect a mayor.  The municipality falls under the Agder District Court and the Agder Court of Appeal.

Municipal council
The municipal council of Hægebostad is made up of 15 representatives that are elected to four year terms. Currently, the party breakdown is as follows:

Culture

Churches
The Church of Norway has two parishes within the municipality of Hægebostad. It is part of the Lister og Mandal prosti (deanery) in the Diocese of Agder og Telemark.

Notable people 
 Johan Arnt Wenaas (1941 in Hægebostad – 2015) a Norwegian priest and writer

References

External links

Municipal fact sheet from Statistics Norway 
Municipal website 

 
Municipalities of Agder
1838 establishments in Norway